Glycerol dialkyl glycerol tetraether lipids (GDGTs) are a class of membrane lipids synthesized by archaea and some bacteria, making them useful biomarkers for these organisms in the geological record. Their presence, structure, and relative abundances in natural materials can be useful as proxies for temperature, terrestrial organic matter input, and soil pH for past periods in Earth history. Some structural forms of GDGT form the basis for the TEX86 paleothermometer. Isoprenoid GDGTs, now known to be synthesized by many archaeal classes, were first discovered in extremophilic archaea cultures. Branched GDGTs, likely synthesized by acidobacteriota, were first discovered in a natural Dutch peat sample in 2000.

Chemical structure 
The two primary structural classes of GDGTs are isoprenoid (isoGDGT) and branched (brGDGT), which refer to differences in the carbon skeleton structures. Isoprenoid compounds are numbered -0 through -8, with the numeral representing the number of cyclopentane rings present within the carbon skeleton structure. The exception is crenarchaeol, a Nitrososphaerota product with one cyclohexane ring moiety in addition to four cyclopentane rings. Branched GDGTs have zero, one, or two cyclopentane moieties and are further classified based the positioning of their branches. They are numbered with roman numerals and letters, with -I indicating structures with four modifications (i.e. either a branch or a cyclopentane moiety), -II indicating structures with five modifications, and -III indicating structures with six modifications. The suffix a after the roman numeral means one of its modifications is a cyclopentane moiety; b means two modifications are cyclopentane moieties. For example, GDGT-IIb is a compound with three branches and two cyclopentane moieties (a total of five modifications). GDGTs form as monolayers and with ether bonds to glycerol, as opposed to as bilayers and with ester bonds as is the case in eukaryotes and most bacteria.

Biological origin 

GDGTs originate as archaeal membrane lipids, whose fatty acids are converted to glycerol via esterification. They were first recognized as being associated with extremophilic archaea, but research in recent decades has discovered the compounds in a wide range of mesophilic environments as well, including soils, lake sediment, and marine deposits. Archaeal phylogenetic classes Nitrososphaerota (formerly Thaumarchaeota), Thermoproteota (formerly Crenarchaeota), "Euryarchaeota", and "Korarchaeota" produce GDGTs. Branched GDGTs are most commonly detected in peats and soils and are most associated with terrestrial settings. To date, no direct evidence for an unequivocal source organism has been reported, but the structural similarity of acidobacterial lipid to brGDGT alkyl chains strongly suggests that acidobacteriota synthesize brGDGT.

GDGT-0 
GDGT-0 has zero cyclopentane moieties and is the most ubiquitous isoGDGT synthesized by archaea. Halophilic archaea are the only group of archaea not known to produce GDGT-0. Carbon isotope analyses and association with sites of anaerobic methane oxidation suggest that GDGT-0 is produced via methanotrophs. In older microbiology literature GDGT-0 is sometimes referred to as caldarchaeol.

GDGT-1 – GDGT-3 
GDGT-1, GDGT-2, and GDGT-3 have one, two, and three cyclopentane rings respectively within their isoprenoid biphytane carbon structures, respectively. Nitrososphaerota are the largest producers of these groups in marine and lacustrine environments. Methanogens are not thought to be large synthesizers of these molecules, with the exception of Methanopyrus kandleri, which does produce them. These classes are lower in abundance than GDGT-0 and GDGT-4 and are used in the TEX86 paleothermometer.

Crenarchaeol 

Crenarchaeol is mainly attributed to ammonium-oxidizing Nitrososphaerota and has four cyclopentane rings plus one cyclohexane ring, which distinguishes it from GDGT-4 and is unique to the Nitrososphaerota phylum. The evolution of the cyclohexane ring was likely to adjust the density of the membrane packing to more optimally function at the cooler ocean temperatures to which Nitrososphaerota adapted. Due to their structural similarities, crenarchaeol and GDGT-4 have similar GC/MS elution times. They are similar in prevalence to GDGT-0 and therefore are not included in the TEX86 paleothermometer because their abundance overwhelms the less abundant GDGT groups. A crenarchaeol isomer, however, is a part of the TEX86 paleothermometer.

GDGT-5 – GDGT-8 

GDGTs -5 through -8 are nearly exclusive to extreme high-temperature environments such as hot springs. The larger number of cyclopentane moieties facilitates a more densely packed membrane lipid structure, which better inhibits trans-membrane passage of protons and ions. Doing so increases the molecules' thermal stability, which is necessary to survive at extreme temperatures.

GDGT-based proxies

TEX86 
Because the number of cyclopentane moieties in a GDGT compound is related to the temperature of the growth environment, with increasing numbers of cyclopentane rings resulting in increased thermal stability and allowing for survival at higher temperatures, GDGT distribution and abundance can be employed as paleoclimate proxies. TEX86 is one such paleothermometer which relates distribution and relative abundance of GDGT-1, GDGT-2, GDGT-3, and crenarchaeol isomer to past sea surface temperature (SST) (see TEX86). GDGT-0 and GDGT-4 (crenarchaeol) are excluded from consideration for this proxy due to their very high abundances relative to isoGDGTs 1–3. The relationship between isoGDGT distribution and temperature is not linear, and some studies have demonstrated its distinctive bias towards unrealistically cold temperatures in the lower latitudes. Current research suggests TEX86 works best in the temperature range 15-34 degrees Celsius. Seasonal variability in archaeal productivity and depth in the water column at which the archaea grow should be considered prior to employing this proxy.

BIT Index 
The branched:isoprenoid tetraether (BIT) index relates the relative abundances of brGDGTs in a natural sample to the relative abundance of soil organic matter in that sample. It is calculated by ratioing a sum of bacterially-produced brGDGT abundances over a sum of archaeal isoGDGT abundances and is based on the fundamental idea that brGDGTs are produced most commonly in terrestrial environments (most ubiquitous in soils and peats) while archaeal isoGDGTs (particularly crenarchaeol) are produced in marine environments. While caveats and analytical uncertainties remain an issue, the BIT index is a potentially useful proxy for assessing the amount of fluvially transported soil organic matter compared to marine organic matter.

MBT/CBT index 
The methylation of branched tetraethers (MBT) and cyclization of branched tetraethers (CBT) indices relate abundances and distributions of bacterially-produced brGDGTs to relative changes in soil pH and mean annual air temperature. Further research is needed to assess seasonal bias, appropriate calibration protocols, and whether the brGDGT distributions record air or soil temperature.

Measurement techniques 

GDGTs are identified via organic geochemical analysis as the polar head groups of the membrane lipids. High-precision liquid chromatography mass spectrometry (HPLC-MS) is the primary means by which GDGTs are analyzed due to this method's tolerance for high temperatures.

References 

Biomarkers
Lipids
Ethers